Gunnar Olsson may refer to:

Gunnar Olsson (actor) (1904–1983), Swedish film actor and director
Gunnar Olsson (canoeist) (born 1960), Swedish Olympic flatwater canoeist
Gunnar Olsson (footballer, born 1901)
Gunnar Olsson (footballer, born 1908) (1908–1974), Swedish soccer player